Hometown Girl is the debut album from American country music artist Mary Chapin Carpenter. It was released on July 30, 1987 (see 1987 in country music) on Columbia Records. The album did not produce any chart singles. It was produced by John Jennings, except for the track "Come On Home", which was produced by Steve Buckingham.

Vik Iyengar of Allmusic gave the album a two-and-a-half star rating out of five, saying that although "her songwriting skills are apparent" on the album, it did not contain as many "rollicking" tunes as Carpenter's following albums. The Washington Post gave it a more favorable review, praising the songs that Carpenter wrote.

Initially, Carpenter intended to include the John Stewart song "Runaway Train" on this album. Her version did not make the final cut, and was instead recorded by Rosanne Cash on her 1987 album King's Record Shop.

Track listing
All songs written by Mary Chapin Carpenter unless noted.
"A Lot Like Me" - 4:37
"Other Streets and Other Towns" - 5:00
"Hometown Girl" - 4:53
"Downtown Train" (Tom Waits) - 4:10
"Family Hands" - 4:34
"A Road Is Just a Road" (Carpenter, John Jennings) - 3:11
"Come On Home" (Pat Bunch, Mary Ann Kennedy, Pam Rose) - 3:17
"Waltz" - 3:24
"Just Because" - 4:58
"Heroes and Heroines" - 4:46

Personnel
As listed in liner notes.
Steve Buckingham — acoustic guitar
Mary Chapin Carpenter — acoustic guitar, vocals
Jon Carroll — piano, Cream of Wheat can
Jonathan Edwards — background vocals, harmonica
John Jennings — acoustic guitar, electric guitar, mandolin, synthesizer, castanets, piano, fretless bass, background vocals
Robbie Magruder — drums, percussion
Mark O'Connor — fiddle, mandolin, mandola
Rico Petruccelli — bass guitar, vibraphone
Tony Rice — acoustic guitar
Mike Stein — fiddle
Scott Young — oboe

References

Mary Chapin Carpenter albums
Columbia Records albums
1987 debut albums
Albums produced by Steve Buckingham (record producer)